Adeh (also Romanized as Ādeh) is a village in Almahdi Rural District, Mohammadyar District, Naqadeh County, West Azerbaijan Province, Iran. At the 2006 census, its population was 218, in 36 families.

References 

Populated places in Naqadeh County